Hinterland Music Festival is a multi-day music festival held at the Avenue of the Saints Amphitheater in St. Charles, Iowa, which was first held in 2015. The festival occurs annually in August and is the largest music festival in Iowa. In addition to live music, Hinterland features art, craft vendors, and camping.

Background 
The festival is organized by Sam Summers, co-owner of a local music venue and booker for a concert series. Water Works Park, located along the Raccoon River four miles southwest of Downtown Des Moines, was set to host for the first year. Its inaugural edition, however, was moved to St. Charles, twenty miles to the south, due to flooding concerns at the park. It drew a crowd of 14,000 over the two days.

2016 - 2021
For 2016, the festival announced plans to return to St. Charles.

The festival expanded to three days in 2019.

Hinterland was canceled in 2020 due to  Covid-19 concerns.

The 2021 lineup was announced on March 16, 2021.

Lineups

2015
Friday, July 31: The Envy Corps, TV on the Radio, Future Islands, Edward Sharpe and the Magnetic Zeros
Saturday, August 1: Madisen Ward and the Mama Bear, Joe Pug, Justin Townes Earle, St. Paul and The Broken Bones, Lucius, Yonder Mountain String Band, Brandi Carlile, Old Crow Medicine Show

2016
Friday, August 5: San Fermin, Houndmouth, Cold War Kids, Ray LaMontagne
Saturday, August 6: Field Division, William Elliott Whitmore, Pokey LaFarge, Hayes Carll, Turnpike Troubadours, Shovels & Rope, Lake Street Dive, Grace Potter, Willie Nelson

2017
Friday, August 4: Annalibera, Foxygen, The Head and the Heart, alt-J
Saturday, August 5: Max Jury, The Cactus Blossoms, JD McPherson, Nikki Lane, Shakey Graves, Dwight Yoakam, Gary Clark Jr., Ryan Adams

2018
Friday, August 3: Ancient Posse, Tash Sultana, Chvrches, Band of Horses
Saturday, August 4: The Nadas, Joshua Hedley, Tyler Childers, J Roddy Walston and the Business, Anderson East, Margo Price, Blackberry Smoke, Nathaniel Rateliff and The Night Sweat, Sturgill Simpson

2019
Friday, August 2: Keuning, Jade Bird, Hippo Campus, Kacey Musgraves, Hozier
Saturday, August 3: Adam Bruce, The Maytags, John Moreland, Ron Gallo, The Dead South, Colter Wall, The Wood Brothers, St. Paul and The Broken Bones, Jason Isbell and the 400 Unit 
Sunday, August 4: Elizabeth Moen, The Nude Party, Ruston Kelly, The War and Treaty, Brent Cobb, Dawes, Maggie Rogers, Brandi Carlile

2021
Friday, August 6: The Avett Brothers, Old Crow Medicine Show,  Caamp,  Yola,  Shura, Hex Girls
Saturday, August 7: Tyler Childers, Black Pumas, Tanya Tucker, The Marcus King Band, Shooter Jennings, Paul Cauthen, The Dip, Kelsey Waldon, Lillie Mae
Sunday, August 8: Leon Bridges, Khruangbin,  Mt. Joy, Elle King, Orville Peck, Hamilton Leithauser, Charley Crockett, Bendigo Fletcher, Vincent Neil Emerson

References

External links
Official Site

2015 establishments in Iowa
Music festivals established in 2015
Music festivals in Iowa
Tourist attractions in Madison County, Iowa